The Persian language and Urdu have had an intricate relationship throughout the history of the latter. Persian historically played a significant role in the formation and development of the modern Urdu, and today acts as its prestige language. 

Modern Persian was brought to the Indian subcontinent by rulers of Turko-Persian origin from Central Asia during the region's medieval period. The large effect of Persian on Urdu is due to its historical status as an official and literary language under many of these rulers, as well as its status as a lingua franca during their reign over the subcontinent.

Persian was displaced by Urdu during colonial rule in India, though it remains in use in its native Iran (as Farsi), Afghanistan (as Dari) and Tajikistan (as Tajik). Urdu is currently the official language and lingua franca of Pakistan, and an officially recognized language in the republic of India.

Overview

Hindustani (sometimes called Hindi–Urdu) is a colloquial language and lingua franca of Pakistan and the Hindi Belt of India. It forms a dialect continuum between its two formal registers: the highly Persianized Urdu, and the de-Persianized, Sanskritized Hindi. Urdu uses a modification of the Persian alphabet, whereas Hindi uses Devanagari. Hindustani in its common form is often referred to as Urdu or Hindi, depending on the background of the speaker/institution. This situation is fraught with sociopolitical factors and controversies, in which Persian plays a part. The common linguistic position is to use Urdu as the term for the register, and Hindustani for the spoken, common language.

Hindustani bears significant influence from Persian; in its common form, it already incorporates many long-assimilated words and phrases from Persian, which it shares with speakers across national borders. As the register Urdu, it bears the most Persian influence of any variety in the subcontinent, featuring further vocabulary, grammar, and pronunciation influences. The latter form of the language is associated with formal contexts and prestige, and is deployed as the medium of written communication, education, and media in Pakistan. This happens in more restricted settings in India, where the Sanskritised register of Hindi is more widely used for these purposes; Urdu appears in the social contexts and institutions associated with Indian Muslims, as well as in literary circles. It is one of India's 22 scheduled languages, and is given official status in multiple Indian states.

History

Persian and Urdu are distinct languages. Persian is classified as an Iranian language, whereas Urdu is an Indo-Aryan language. They fall under the larger grouping of the Indo-Iranian languages, and hence share some linguistic features due to common descent.

However, the majority of influence from Persian is direct, through a process often called Persianization. Following the Turko-Persian conquest of South Asia by the Ghaznavids, Persian was introduced into the Indian subcontinent. The Delhi dialect of Old Hindi and other dialects of South Asia received a large influx of Persian, Chagatai and Arabic vocabulary. The subsequent Delhi Sultanate gave way for a further continuation of this. The basis in general for the introduction of the Persian language into the subcontinent was set, from its earliest days, by Afghan and various Persianate dynasties from Central Asia of Turkic origin. 

This lexically diverse register of language, which emerged in the northern Indian subcontinent, was commonly called Zaban-e Urdu-e Mualla ('language of the orda - court').

Unlike Persian, which is an Iranian language, Urdu is an Indo-Aryan language, written in the Perso-Arabic script; Urdu has a Indic vocabulary base derived from Sanskrit and Prakrit, with specialized vocabulary being borrowed from Persian. Some grammatical elements peculiar to Persian, such as the enclitic ezāfe and the use of pen-names, were readily absorbed into Urdu literature both in the religious and secular spheres.

Hindustani gained distinction in literary and cultural spheres in South Asia because of its role as a lingua franca in the Indian subcontinent as a result of the large number of speakers the language has, both as a first and second language. A prominent crossover writer was Amir Khusrau, an Indian poet whose Persian and Urdu couplets are to this day read in South Asia. Muhammad Iqbal, the national poet of Pakistan, was also a prominent South Asian writer who wrote in both Persian and Urdu.

Sample comparison
The following is a comparison between Iranian Persian and formal Urdu, using text from Article 1 of the Universal Declaration of Human Rights. Both are in the Nastaliq calligraphic hand.

See also
 Persian language in the Indian subcontinent
 Qaumi Taranah, the national anthem of Pakistan composed almost entirely in Persian
 Indo-Iranian languages, a branch of the Indo-European language family
 History of Hindustani

References

External links
English to Urdu and Persian trilingual dictionary
Urdu and Persian Forum (archived 30 November 2016)
Perso-Arabic loanwords in Hindustani

Urdu
Persian language in Pakistan
Hindustani language
Linguistic history of India
Linguistic history of Pakistan
Comparison of Indo-European languages